Illuminations is the sixth album by Indigenous Canadian-American singer Buffy Sainte-Marie, released in 1969 on Vanguard Records. From a foundation of vocals and acoustic guitar, Sainte-Marie and producer Maynard Solomon made pioneering use of the  Buchla 100 synthesizer to create electronically treated vocals. It was the first quadraphonic vocal album released. The album's only single was "Better to Find Out for Yourself".

British experimental music magazine The Wire listed Illuminations amongst its '100 Albums that Set the World on Fire While No-One was Listening'. Pitchfork ranked it the 66th best album of the 1960s.

Production
The album was among the first to make prominent use of the Buchla synthesizer, which was previously featured on Morton Subotnick's 1967 recording Silver Apples of the Moon. On Illuminations, the synthesizer was employed to create treated electronic sound, particularly of Sainte-Marie's voice. The opening track "God is Alive, Magic is Afoot" featured lyrics by Leonard Cohen. Peter Schickele provided arrangements to "Mary", "Adam" and "The Angel", whilst the four tracks "Suffer the Little Children", "With You, Honey", "Guess Who I Saw in Paris" and "He's a Keeper of the Fire" were Saint-Marie's first work not to be produced by Vanguard boss Maynard Solomon. Instead, they had a stripped-down rock sound and were produced by little known folk-jazz songwriter Mark Roth. Bob Bozina played guitar, John Craviotta drums and percussion, and Rick Oxendine played bass.

Reception
Illuminations has acquired a fan base quite distinct from that associated with any of Sainte-Marie's other albums. In addition to its being cited as a favourite album by a number of musicians (notably Steve Hackett), a number of critics have seen its twisted, eerie soundscapes as laying the grounds for the evolution of gothic music as well as having an influence on New Weird America.

In 2000, just before Vanguard re-issued it on CD, Wire magazine listed Illuminations amongst its '100 Albums that Set the World on Fire While No-One was Listening'.

Track listing
All songs composed by Buffy Sainte-Marie except where noted.

 "God Is Alive, Magic Is Afoot" (text by Leonard Cohen from his novel Beautiful Losers / music by Buffy Sainte-Marie) – 4:51
 "Mary" – 1:30
 "Better to Find Out for Yourself" – 2:12
 "The Vampire" – 2:05
 "Adam" (Richie Havens) – 5:05
 "The Dream Tree" – 2:34
 "Suffer the Little Children" – 2:53
 "The Angel" (Ed Freeman) – 3:41
 "With You, Honey" – 1:48
 "Guess Who I Saw in Paris" – 2:25
 "He's a Keeper of the Fire" – 3:21
 "Poppies" – 3:26

Personnel

 Buffy Sainte Marie - Vocals, Guitar
 Electronic Score – Michael Czajkowski
 Bass – Rick Oxendine (tracks: 9, 10, 11)
 Drums – John Craviotto (tracks: 9, 10, 11)
 Lead Guitar – Bob Bozina (tracks: 6, 9, 10, 11)
 Arranged By – Peter Schickele (tracks: 2, 5, 8)
 Engineer – Bob Lurie, Ed Friedner
 Mixed By – Jack Lathrop
 Producer – Maynard Solomon (tracks 1 to 6, 8, 12)
 Producer - Mark Roth (tracks: 7, 9 to 11)

References

Illuminations (Buffy Sainte-Marie album)
Illuminations (Buffy Sainte-Marie album)
Illuminations (Buffy Sainte-Marie album)
Illuminations (Buffy Sainte-Marie album)